Bram Schwarz (born 28 April 1998) is a Dutch rower. He is the son of Sven Schwarz. His uncle was Ralph Schwarz.

He is an Olympic finalist and won a medal at the 2019 World Rowing Championships.

References

External links

1998 births
Living people
Dutch male rowers
World Rowing Championships medalists for the Netherlands
Washington Huskies men's rowers
Rowers at the 2020 Summer Olympics